Cypherotylus californicus, sometimes known as the blue fungus beetle or blue pleasing fungus beetle, is a species of pleasing fungus beetle in the family Erotylidae. It is recorded from Wyoming, Colorado, New Mexico, Arizona, California, Kansas, and the Mexican state of Sonora.

Biology
It starts its life in the spring when it hatches from an egg and pupates in the summer. It mates and lays eggs in the late summer and early fall. It feeds on the Conk Fungus it can find growing on logs and trees. Their elytra are blue with black dots, and it turns grey as they age.

Gallery

References

Further reading

External links

 

Erotylidae
Articles created by Qbugbot
Beetles described in 1842